The R726 road is a regional road in Ireland which runs west-east from the R417 in Carlow, County Carlow to the N81 near  Rathvilly, County Carlow.

See also
Roads in Ireland
National primary road
National secondary road

References
Roads Act 1993 (Classification of Regional Roads) Order 2006 – Department of Transport

Regional roads in the Republic of Ireland
Roads in County Carlow